The Friars' Walk drill hall is a former military installation in Stafford.

History
The building was designed by Hanley, architects, as the headquarters of the Staffordshire Yeomanry and was completed in November 1913. The drill hall also accommodated 6th Staffordshire Battery of the Royal Field Artillery (RFA). The parade ground could be accessed by guns and horses through doors in Bailey Street. The Staffordshire Yeomanry was mobilised at the drill hall in August 1914 before being deployed to Salonika. The RFA battery served on the Western Front, initially with the 46th (North Midland) Division.

After the defence cuts of 1967, which led to the transfer of the regimental headquarters to Wolverhampton, the drill hall was decommissioned and converted for use by the maintenance department of Staffordshire County Council.

References

Drill halls in England
Buildings and structures in Stafford